2004 raid on Grozny was a series of overnight attacks in central Grozny, capital of Chechnya. It was carried out by Chechen insurgents.

The assassination of the Chechnyan president Akhmad Kadyrov on May 9, 2004 is seen as the beginning of the offensive and was followed by a major attack carried out a month after rebels captured arms depot in the capital of the Ingushetia region, leaving with 200,000 weapons and a trove of ammunition. According to estimates of the investigation group, 250-400 fighters entered Grozny on August 21, established their own roadblocks, and simultaneously attacked a number of polling places and other targets. According to law enforcement sources, this attack killed 58 members of the police and pro-Moscow militia and five federal soldiers. More than a dozen civilians were also killed. 

The Grozny raid was also part of the series of attacks that also included targets in Russia. After the major offensive at Grozny, Chechen women suicide bombers successfully blew two passenger airliners, killing 90 passengers.

See also
2004 Nazran raid
2004 Avtury raid

References

21st-century mass murder in Russia
Operations of the Second Chechen War
Terrorist incidents in Russia in 2004
Grozny
Battles involving Chechnya
Grozny
History of Grozny
August 2004 events in Russia

Battles in 2004